"Guilty" is a song written by Don Reid and Harold Reid, and recorded by American country music group The Statler Brothers.  It was released in July 1983 as the second single from their album Today.  The song peaked at number 9 on the Billboard Hot Country Singles chart.

Chart performance

References

1983 singles
The Statler Brothers songs
Mercury Nashville singles
Song recordings produced by Jerry Kennedy
Songs written by Don Reid (singer)
Songs written by Harold Reid
1983 songs